Sodium dithionite (also known as sodium hydrosulfite) is a white crystalline powder with a sulfurous odor. Although it is stable in dry air, it decomposes in hot water and in acid solutions.

Structure
The structure has been examined by Raman spectroscopy and single-crystal X-ray diffraction. The dithionite dianion has C symmetry, with almost eclipsed with a 16° O-S-S-O torsional angle. In the dihydrated form, the dithionite anion has gauche 56° O-S-S-O torsional angle.

A weak S-S bond is indicated by the S-S distance of 239 pm, which is elongated by ca. 30 pm relative to a typical S-S bond.  Because this bond is fragile, the dithionite anion dissociates in solution into the [SO2]− radicals, as has been confirmed by EPR spectroscopy. It is also observed that 35S undergoes rapid exchange between S2O42− and SO2 in neutral or acidic solution, consistent with the weak S-S bond in the anion.

Preparation
Sodium dithionite is produced industrially by reduction of sulfur dioxide. Approximately 300,000 tons were produced in 1990. The route using zinc powder is a two-step process:
2SO2  +  Zn  →  ZnS2O4
ZnS2O4  +  2NaOH  →  Na2S2O4  +  Zn(OH)2

The sodium borohydride method obeys the following stoichiometry:
NaBH4  +  8NaOH  +  8SO2  →  4Na2S2O4  +  NaBO2   +  6H2O
Each equivalent of H− reduces two equivalents of sulfur dioxide. Formate has also been used as the reductant.

Properties and reactions

Hydrolysis
Sodium dithionite is stable when dry, but aqueous solutions deteriorate due to the following reaction:
 2 S2O42− + H2O → S2O32− + 2 HSO3−
This behavior is consistent with the instability of dithionous acid.  Thus, solutions of sodium dithionite cannot be stored for a long period of time.

Anhydrous sodium dithionite decomposes to sodium sulfate and sulfur dioxide above 90 °C in the air. In absence of air, it decomposes quickly above 150 °C to sodium sulfite, sodium thiosulfate, sulfur dioxide and trace amount of sulfur.

Redox reactions
Sodium dithionite is a reducing agent.  At pH 7, the potential is -0.66 V compared to the normal hydrogen electrode.  Redox occurs with formation of bisulfite:
S2O42-  +  2 H2O   →   2 HSO3−  +  2 e− +  2 H+

Sodium dithionite reacts with oxygen:
Na2S2O4 + O2 + H2O → NaHSO4 + NaHSO3
These reactions exhibit complex pH-dependent equilibria involving bisulfite, thiosulfate, and sulfur dioxide.

With organic carbonyls
In the presence of aldehydes, sodium dithionite reacts either to form α-hydroxy-sulfinates at room temperature or to reduce the aldehyde to the corresponding alcohol above a temperature of 85 °C.  Some ketones are also reduced under similar conditions.

Applications

Industry
Being water-soluble, sodium dithionite is used as a reducing agent in some industrial dyeing processes.  In the case of sulfur dyes and vat dyes, an otherwise water-insoluble dye can be reduced into a water-soluble alkali metal salt (e.g. indigo dye).

Sodium dithionite can also be used for water treatment, aquarium water conditioners, gas purification, cleaning, and stripping. It has also been applied as a sulfonating agent. In addition to the textile industry, this compound is used in industries concerned with leather, foods, polymers, photography, and many others, often as a decolourising agent. It is even used domestically as a decoloring agent for white laundry, when it has been accidentally stained by way of a dyed item slipping into the high temperature washing cycle. It is usually available in 5 gram sachets termed hydrosulfite after the antiquated name of the salt.

It is the an active ingredient in "Iron Out Rust Stain Remover", a commercial rust product.

Laboratory
Sodium dithionite is often used in physiology experiments as a means of lowering solutions' redox potential (Eo'  -0.66 V vs SHE at pH 7).  Potassium ferricyanide is usually used as an oxidizing chemical in such experiments (Eo' ~ .436 V at pH 7). In addition, sodium dithionite is often used in soil chemistry experiments to determine the amount of iron that is not incorporated in primary silicate minerals. Hence, iron extracted by sodium dithionite is also referred to as "free iron."  The strong affinity of the dithionite ion for bi- and trivalent metal cations (M2+, M3+) allows it to enhance the solubility of iron, and therefore dithionite is a useful chelating agent.

Aqueous solutions of sodium dithionite were once used to produce 'Fieser's solution' for the removal of oxygen from a gas stream.  Pyrithione can be prepared in a two-step synthesis from 2-bromopyridine by oxidation to the N-oxide with a suitable peracid followed by substitution using sodium dithionite to introduce the thiol functional group.

Photography
It is used in Kodak fogging developer, FD-70.  This is used in the second step in processing black and white positive images, for making slides. It is part of the Kodak Direct Positive Film Developing Outfit.

Safety
The wide use of sodium dithionite is attributable in part to its low toxicity  at 2.5 g/kg (rats, oral).

See also
Dithionite

References

External links
Sodium dithionite - ipcs inchem

Bleaches
Dithionites
Sodium compounds
Reducing agents